Luning or Lüning may refer to
Places
Luning, Nevada, an unincorporated town in Mineral County, Nevada, United States
Luning Formation, a geologic formation in Nevada, United States

Surname
Henry Luning (1905–1965), American Olympic swimmer
Hermann Lüning (1814–1874), German philologist
J.C. Luning (1863–1928), Mayor of Leesburg, Florida, United States
Örjan Lüning (1919–1995), Swedish philatelist